The 1965–66 Yorkshire Football League was the 40th season in the history of the Yorkshire Football League, a football competition in England.

Division One

Division One featured 12 clubs which competed in the previous season, along with four new clubs, promoted from Division Two:
Barton Town
Frickley Colliery reserves
Goole Town reserves
Stocksbridge Works

League table

Map

Division Two

Division Two featured eleven clubs which competed in the previous season, along with six new clubs.
Clubs relegated from Division One:
Brodsworth Miners Welfare
Harrogate Railway Athletic
Hull Brunswick
Plus:
Denaby United, relegated from the Midland League
Heeley Amateurs
Leeds Ashley Road

League table

Map

League Cup

Semi-finals

Final

References

1965–66 in English football leagues
Yorkshire Football League